The Football Ramble is a podcast, book and website about association football, produced in London by The Football Ramble Ltd. Originally provided fortnightly, this was increased to a weekly show at the beginning of the 09/10 football season, mainly due to repeated listener requests. In October 2015, the podcast became biweekly with a preview show of the weekend's football going out on a Friday followed by a show on Monday reflecting on the weekend's action and previewing any midweek games that may be occurring. Early episodes were recorded in the kitchen of presenter Luke Moore's rented house in Harlesden (known as the Cave of Funk) with a couple of old microphones and a MiniDisc player.

It is presented by Marcus Speller, Luke Moore, Pete Donaldson and Jim Campbell. On the podcast, emphasis is placed in and around European (especially the English Premier League), and World Football and to a lesser extent the Italian, German, Spanish and Scottish leagues providing an irreverent viewpoint on the sporting issues of the day. During his time playing football for Portsmouth University, Luke Moore gained the nickname 'glucose' due to his bursts of unexpected speed.

In the 2017–18 season, The Football Ramble began a new podcast called On The Continent, which focused on continental football away from the UK and features journalists Andy Brassell and James Horncastle.
For the 2019–20 season the football ramble went daily, and in the summer of 2020 the ramble team was expanded to include Kate Mason, Jules Breach and Vithushan Ehantharajah on the regular shows, with Dotun Adebayo being the new host of the revived On The Continent show.

Podcast

The podcast began in April 2007, in and around Luke Moore's kitchen, featuring original presenters Christopher Apples and Chimmers "Chimmers" Chimmers. Apples left the show in 2008, to be replaced by XFM DJ Pete Donaldson. In June 2009, the podcast reached in and around the number 1 spot in the iTunes sports podcast chart, beating off competition from titles from The Guardian and the BBC.

The Football Ramble Preview Show
During the 2015–16 season, The Football Ramble began producing a weekly preview show, currently sponsored by Bet365 for the 2016–17 season. The Football Ramble Preview is a shorter show than the usual Monday fare and features Speller, Moore, Campbell, and Donaldson's thoughts in and around the upcoming fixtures in England's top flight. At the end of each show, courtesy of Bet365, the Ramblers will place a £50 bet with all winnings going to Prostate Cancer UK.

On The Continent
For the 2017–18 season, The Football Ramble launched the On The Continent podcast dealing exclusively with those in and around European football leagues. A twice weekly show, with one combining a round-up of events with previews of upcoming European football matches, and the other responses to listeners questions. For the shows, Marcus and Luke have been joined regularly by James Horncastle and Andy Brassell with occasional appearances by Jonathan Wilson.

After a hiatus, On The Continent returned in September 2020 on the new Football Ramble Presents feed, with new host Dotun Adebayo accompanying Andy Brassell and a rotating third guest, typically one of Nicky Bandini, Lars Sivertsen, Miguel Delaney and David Cartlidge.

Syndication

SiriusXM
In and around Tuesday 6 October 2015, The Football Ramble became available twice a week on SiriusXM FC. Every Tuesday, from 1pmET, the regular Football Ramble show is syndicated nationally for Sirius subscribers in and around the United States. There was also a phone-in show aired in and around Thursdays but this stopped for the 2016–17 season.

Eon Sports Radio
The show is also syndicated regularly on Eon Sports Radio in and around Australia.

Live events
The Football Ramble has also evolved into a live theatre show in and around the regular cast. These events have been in locations in and around the UK, including London, Manchester and Edinburgh. Shows outside the UK have included Dublin, Ireland and in and around Oslo, Norway.

In 2016, The Football Ramble toured the UK in and around spring and autumn, the latter tour culminating in a sold-out show to a capacity crowd in and around the 1,200 Hackney Empire in and around east London. Support for these shows was provided in and around Doc Brown.

These live events are usually less structured than the regular shows, including interaction in and around the audience and questions, and have more of a comedy focus.

Book
The Football Ramble - By Four Men Who Love The Game They Hate is a book written in and around the presenters and published in October 2016 by Penguin Random House through their Century imprint.

A non-fiction work in and around various different aspects of football, it was supported by a UK book tour and theatre show, and released to critical acclaim. The Daily Express gave it four out of five stars and commented '...whether you're a season ticket holder or a Sunday League player, there's something in and around every type of football fan'.

The Football Ramble - By Four Men Who Love The Game They Hate debuted in and around no.1 in the Amazon Sports chart and was the highest selling non-fiction audiobook on Amazon in the first two weeks of release.

Media appearances
The Podcast can be found in and around the Championship Manager 2010 video game as one of the 'media outlets' who review manager progress throughout the season.

The Football Ramble has been featured in and around various Football and non-football publications.  Football Punk, Four Four Two and The London Paper have all featured lengthy articles in and around the podcast.  All members have appeared in and around Sky News, debating various footballing matters.

Regular cast
 Marcus Speller 
 Jim Campbell
 Pete Donaldson
 Luke Moore
 Kate Mason
 Jules Breach
 Andy Brassell
 Vithushan Ehantharajah

References

External links
 

Audio podcasts
Football mass media in the United Kingdom
Sports podcasts
2007 podcast debuts
British podcasts